Privacy in English law is a rapidly developing area of English law that considers situations where individuals have a legal right to informational privacy - the protection of personal or private information from misuse or unauthorized disclosure. Privacy law is distinct from those laws such as trespass or assault that are designed to protect physical privacy. Such laws are generally considered as part of criminal law or the law of tort. Historically, English common law has recognized no general right or tort of privacy, and offered only limited protection through the doctrine of breach of confidence and a "piecemeal" collection of related legislation on topics like harassment and data protection.
The introduction of the Human Rights Act 1998 incorporated into English law the European Convention on Human Rights. Article 8.1 of the ECHR provided an explicit right to respect for a private life. The Convention also requires the judiciary to "have regard" to the Convention in developing the common law.

Definition
The earliest definition of privacy in English law was given by Thomas M. Cooley who defined privacy as "the right to be left alone". In 1972 the Younger Committee, an inquiry into privacy stated that the term could not be defined satisfactorily. Again in 1990 the Calcutt Committee concluded that: "nowhere have we found a wholly satisfactory statutory definition of privacy".

Common law

There is currently a  right to privacy in common law. This point was reaffirmed when the House of Lords ruled in Campbell v MGN (a case involving a supermodel who claim that she has not taken drugs). It has also been stated that the European Convention on Human Rights does not require the development of an independent tort of privacy. In the absence of a common law right to privacy in English law torts such as the equitable doctrine breach of confidence, torts linked to the intentional infliction of harm to the person and public law torts relating to the use of police powers have been used to fill a gap in the law. The judiciary has developed the law in an incremental fashion and have resisted the opportunity to create a new tort.

Expansion of privacy laws

British Radio Jockey Sara Cox's case against The People newspaper was one of the first celebrity privacy cases. The media referred to the case as a "watershed". The disc jockey sued after the newspaper printed nude photographs of her taken while on her honeymoon. However the case was settled out of court and so did not establish a precedent. The decision was seen as discrediting the Press Complaints Commission

The expansion of the doctrine of breach of confidence under the Human Rights Act began with the Douglas v Hello! decision. Section 6 of the Human Rights Act requires English courts to give effect to the rights in the Convention when developing the common law. There is no need to show a pre-existing relationship of confidence where private information is involved and the courts have recognised that the publication of private material represents a detriment in itself. The Human Rights act has horizontal effect in disputes between private individuals meaning that the Human Rights Act is just as applicable as if one party had been a public body. Breach of confidence now extends to private information (regardless of whether it is confidential) so as to give effect to Article 8 of the European Convention on Human Rights. Before this breach of confidence afforded "umbrella protection" to both personal and non-personal information.

ECHR challenge

Following Max Mosley's successful action against the News of the World newspaper for publishing details of his private life, he announced that he would challenge English law's implementation of the Article 8 right to privacy guaranteed when the Human Rights Act implemented the European Convention on Human Rights into English law. The European Court of Human Rights (ECHR) was asked to rule on the issue of "prior notification". This would require journalists to approach the subject of any investigation and inform them of the details of any allegations made about them, therefore allowing an injunction to be claimed. The ECHR ruled that domestic law was not in conflict with the convention.

Debate
The increasing protections afforded to the private lives of individuals has sparked debate as to whether English law gives enough weight to freedom of the press and whether intervention by Parliament would be beneficial. The editor of the satirical magazine Private Eye Ian Hislop has argued against the development of English privacy law. He told BBC's Panorama: "You don't have to prove it [an allegation] isn't true, you just have to prove that it's private by your definition. And in some of the cases the definition of privacy is pretty weak." However, Liberal Democrat politician Mark Oaten has stated that the press were right to expose details of his private life:
"I concluded that however awful it may be, it's better to have a press which can expose MPs' private lives because it means we have a free press… it means we can expose corruption." Max Mosley has argued for the further advancement of the law whereas the editor of the Daily Mail newspaper Paul Dacre has accused Mr Justice Eady, the judge in the Mosley case, of bringing in a privacy law by the back door.

Key cases

 Entick v Carrington
 Prince Albert v Strange
 AMP v. Persons Unknown
 A v. B plc
 Bernstein of Leigh v. Skyviews & General Ltd
 Campbell v Mirror Group Newspapers Ltd
 Douglas v Hello!
 Google Inc v Vidal-Hall & Ors
 Gulati & Ors v MGN Limited
 Halliday v Creation Consumer Finance Ltd (CCF)
 His Royal Highness the Prince of Wales v. Associated Newspapers Ltd
 Kaye v. Robertson
 Mosley v News Group Newspapers Limited
 Murray v Big Pictures (UK) Ltd
 McKennitt v Ash
 Theakston v Mirror Group Newspapers Ltd
 Wainwright v Home Office
 Wood v Commissioner of Police for the Metropolis

European rulings
 Von Hannover v. Germany

See also
 2011 British privacy injunctions controversy
 Breach of confidence
 European Convention on Human Rights
 Press Complaints Commission

Further reading
 J. Morgan, “Privacy, Confidence and Horizontal Effect: “Hello” Trouble” (2003) 62 (2) Cambridge Law Journal 444
 H. Fenwick and G. Phillipson, “Confidence and Privacy: A Re-Examination” [1996] Cambridge Law Journal 447.
 H. Fenwick and G. Phillipson, “Breach of Confidence as a Privacy Remedy in the Human Rights Act Era” (2000) 63 Modern Law Review 660.
 R. Singh and J. Strachan, “Privacy Postponed” [2003] European Human Rights Law Review Special Issue: Privacy 12-25.

Notes and references

External links
 Concerns and Ideas about the Developing English Law of Privacy(and how knowledge of foreign law might be of help) A research project undertaken by the Institute of Global Law 
 Can I Sue Google If It Says I’m Gay? The Tales of Internet Defamation in the UK

English law
English tort law
English privacy law